New Tattoo is an album by Mötley Crüe.

New Tattoo may also refer to:
New Tattoo, an album by Tim Hicks
"New Tattoo", a song by Dave Alvin from his album Romeo's Escape